The Short History of the Long Road is a 2019 American drama film, written and directed by Ani Simon-Kennedy. It stars Sabrina Carpenter, Steven Ogg, Danny Trejo, Maggie Siff and Rusty Schwimmer.

It had its world premiere at the Tribeca Film Festival on April 27, 2019. It was released on June 12, 2020, by FilmRise.

Plot

For teenage Nola (Carpenter), home is the open road. Her self-reliant father (Ogg) is her anchor in a life of transience. The pair crisscross the United States in a lovingly refurbished RV, relishing their independence and making ends meet by doing odd jobs. A shocking rupture, though, casts Nola out on her own. She makes her way to Albuquerque, New Mexico, in search of a mother she never knew. When her motorhome unexpectedly breaks down, she forges a bond with an auto body shop owner (Trejo), and senses the possibility of mooring her ship in this storm.

Cast
 Sabrina Carpenter as Nola
 Steven Ogg as Clint, Nola's dad
 Danny Trejo as Miguel
 Maggie Siff as Cheryl, Nola's mom
 Rusty Schwimmer as Marcie
 Jashaun St. John as Blue
 Jackamoe Buzzell as Security Guard

Production
In August 2018, it was announced Sabrina Carpenter, Steven Ogg, Danny Trejo, Maggie Siff, Rusty Schwimmer and Jashaun St. John had joined the cast of the film, with Ani Simon-Kennedy directing from a screenplay she wrote.

Reception
The film received generally positive reviews. The site's critical consensus reads, "A potential breakout vehicle for its writer-director as well as its star, The Short History of the Long Road finds fresh byways along its well-traveled path." Metacritic, which uses a weighted average, assigned the film a score of 60 out of 100, based on 7 critics, indicating “mixed or average reviews.”

Variety praised Carpenter's performance, stating that she "permeated the screen with an astutely soulful quality that’s tough to turn away from."

Release
It had its world premiere at the Tribeca Film Festival on April 27, 2019.

References

External links
 

2019 films
American drama films
American independent films
2010s English-language films
2010s American films